The 1916 Auckland Rugby League season was the 8th year of the organisation.

All grades were dramatically affected by players enlisting in the war efforts. Prior to the commencement of the season it was stated in the management committee meeting that 487 players in the Auckland district alone had committed to the war effort. Teams were filled with older players and juniors. The Otahuhu senior team as was noted at their committee meeting featured “only three men eligible for military service..., and these were all registered and waiting to be called up. Of the remainder, six were married men with families, two were permanent force men, and four were under military age”.

Despite this attendances were still good, with the mid season match between City Rovers and Grafton Athletic at Victoria Park attracting 3,000 spectators. While the Round 7 fixtures at Victoria Park drew the same number of spectators and 4,000 attending the round 8 matches. All the gate takings were donated to the Children's Hospital Ward Equipment Fund. The final round saw over 4,000 attend Victoria Park where City Rovers won the title with a 14 points to 10 win over Grafton Athletic. City also went on to win the end of season knockout Roope Rooster competition.

Owing to the effects of the war on playing strength and out of respect for the tremendous war effort there were no representative matches played in 1916, though City Rovers did play the Lower Waikato in two exhibition fixtures (home and away), and Richmond Rovers and Thames Old Boys (based in Auckland) travelled to Thames to play a match at the season end.

Season news

End of season report 
At the end of the 1916 season a report was made on the season and it was presented to the Auckland Rugby League annual meeting in May 1917. It stated that the playing ranks had been severely depleted over the past season as over 600 players had joined the ranks of the military to fight in the first world war. There were 42 teams in total to compete across six grades (7 in the senior grade, 5 in second grade, 9 in third grade, 7 in the fourth grade, 8 in the fifth grade, and 6 in the sixth grade). Fourteen clubs were affiliated to the Auckland Rugby League with over 800 players in total. The Mangere, Remuera, and Northcote clubs withdrew from the competition due to so many of their players going to war.

Significantly they secured the option of the Chinamen's gardens just off Stanley Street and this was to later be turned into Carlaw Park.

It was suggested that the newly formed Garrison Artillery Club enter a first grade team however as there were already 6 teams competing there was a fear that it would weaken the existing teams. Otahuhu asked for Auckland Rugby League to request a special Saturday afternoon “train to be run to bring players, spectators and the general public to Otahuhu or Saturday afternoons” during the season.

The Junior Advisory Board was J.J. Herrick, J.J. Bolger, V.M. Sommerville, W.E. Frost, G. Wrightson, B. Davis, W.J. Davidson (Hon. Sec), T. Fielding (Chairman), T.P. Boswell, P. Henry, W.J. Alderton, O. Grubb, W. Tole, and H. Scally.

Death of Graham Cook and Frank McWhirter in WW1
Graham Cook and Frank McWhirter, who had played first grade football for Ponsonby United (Cook 1915, McWhirter 1914–15) were both killed while fighting in World War I in France. McWhirter had played representative football for Auckland against Thames and Waikato in 1915. The two had been childhood friends, both attending Ponsonby school, and then going on to work for the Auckland Gas Company. They also enlisted on the same day. Frank McWhirter was killed on July 9, 1916, at the Somme in northern France and is buried at Cite Bonjean Military Cemetery, Armentieres, France. Graham Cook was also killed at the Somme on July 11, 1916, in France.

1st Grade championship
The 1st grade championship had been competing for the Myers Cup from 1910 to 1914 but after the beginning of the war the league decided to not award trophies though the grade competitions were still competed for as normal. Thirty matches were played during the season with the 20 being played at Victoria Park. The Devonport Domain hosted the 5 North Shore Albions home matches, while Otahuhu hosted 5 matches.

1st Grade standings
{|
|-
|

1st Grade results

Round 1

Round 2

Round 3

Round 4 
Newton had trouble fielding a full team for their match with Ponsonby and ultimately played with 11, with the 28 to 3 defeat being unsurprising.

Round 5

Round 6 
The point scoring phenomenon Karl Ifwersen was missing for Grafton and possibly as a result Newton pulled off a massive upset when they defeated Grafton by 8 points to 3. Newton had conceded 73 points and scored just 11 over their previous two matches.

Round 7

Round 8 
On July 15 the Observer newspaper published a collage of photographs from the July 8 games at Victoria Park. The images were of the following subjects: (1) Jack Paul, the North Shore captain; (2) James (Jimmy) Carlaw (who Carlaw Park was later named after), speaking to Dick Benson, the Auckland Rugby League secretary; (3) Jim Rukutai, the captain of City; (4) Ronald MacDonald (former New Zealand international); (5) Scrum action from the City v North Shore match; (6) Auckland Rugby League secretary; (7) A spectator; (8) James Carlaw, (9) A spectator; (10) secretary Dick Benson; (11) Caretaker of the park and constable for Freemans Bay; (12) Jack Endean.

Round 9 
Otahuhu despite playing at home were two men short for their match with Newton and went down 8 points to 4.

Round 10

Roope Rooster knockout competition
There were 3,000 spectators in attendance at the Round 1 matches at Victoria Park. There were 3,000 in attendance again for the semi final between City Rovers and Ponsonby United, again played at Victoria Park in muddy conditions. As the result was a draw it meant that the teams and Auckland Rugby League had to decide on how to proceed with the competition. The eventual decision was for Ponsonby to advance to the final and City Rovers to play Newton in a second semi final. City defeated Newton and then in the final they defeated Ponsonby United in front of almost 5,000 spectators.

Round 1

Semi finals

Final

Top point and try scorers
The following point scoring lists include both Senior Championship matches and the Roope Rooster competition. Karl Ifwersen was the top point scorer for the third consecutive year with 56 points. He also topped the try scoring list with 8.

Lower grade competitions
The lower grades consisted of second, third, fourth, fifth grade, and for the first time a sixth grade. Thames Old Boys was made up of players from Thames who had settled in Auckland. The Mangere Rangers club, who only fielded a team in the second grade to start the season wrote to the league in mid June that they had ceased to be a club. The Telegraph Messengers Club nominated a team for the fourth Grade. They were often named Post and Telegraph in the media reports during the season. In August the newly formed Riverhead club's third grade team was forced to withdraw due to so many of their players enlisting. They wore green. Their remaining players were transferred to the City Rovers second grade side. North Shore Albions won the fifth grade undefeated.

Second grade standings
Mangere Rangers withdrew after 2 rounds with neither of their results to that point reported. Otahuhu won the championship around the 12th of August, which was round 12. A knockout competition was played late in the season which Ponsonby won.
{|
|-
|

Third grade standings
Ponsonby withdrew after round 1 with their result not reported. Richmond B withdrew after 7 rounds, while Riverhead withdrew after 11 rounds. City Rovers won the championship however 22 results were not reported so their record would obviously have been better than Newton Ranger's. The Newton Rangers end of season function mentioned that Newton had indeed finished runners up.
{|
|-
|

Fourth grade standings (Endean Memorial Shield)
City won the competition when they beat Sunnyside in the final on August 26 with a 13-0 win. The Northcote A team withdrew after just 2 rounds after 0-32 and 0-36 losses to Newton, and Ponsonby respectively. City won the championship undefeated after recording wins of 42-0, 31-0, 5-3, 15-0, 20-0, 20-0, 35-0, 14-0, 11-0, and 13-0, along with a 0-0 draw with Otahuhu. Otahuhu only had two of their results reported in the entire season and it is likely that they recorded several more wins.
{|
|-
|

Fifth grade standings
Ponsonby withdrew after 1 round with no result reported. Manukau defeated Grafton Athletic in round 9 but Grafton were awarded the match after a protest. North Shore won the championship. Their scores were reported for 9 of their 12 matches. 
{|
|-
|

Sixth grade standings
Ponsonby withdrew after 1 round with no result reported. Otahuhu withdrew after 5 rounds after 0-41, and 0-52 losses with 2 other results not reported. The City side sealed the championship after a 15-5 win over Manukau in round 10 on July 29. With 2 rounds remaining they were too far ahead to be caught.
{|
|-
|

End of season exhibition matches
The week after the final was played a City Rovers organised side consisting of players from City, Newton, Grafton, and North Shore travelled to Ngaruawahia to play Lower Waikato. City won by 13 points to 9. A week later Richmond and Thames Old Boys (based in Auckland) travelled to Thames to play a match. It was won by Thames Old Boys by 11 to 5.

The last match of the season was played on 9 September when City Rovers played against Lower Waikato at Victoria Park. City Rovers won by 19 points to 8. This brought the Auckland Rugby League season to a close. The curtain-raiser was a match between the Referees Association and Auckland rugby league players and was won by the referees by 10 points to 5.

Representative fixtures
There were no representative fixtures played in 1916 owing to the effects of the war on senior playing numbers.

References

External links
 Auckland Rugby League Official Site

Auckland Rugby League seasons
Auckland Rugby League